Adams County is a county in the U.S. state of Wisconsin. As of the 2020 census, the population was 20,654. Its county seat is Friendship. The county was created in 1848 and organized in 1853. Sources differ as to whether its name is in honor of the second President of the United States, John Adams, or his son, the sixth President, John Quincy Adams.

History
The founders of Adams County were from upstate New York.  These people were "Yankee" settlers, that is to say they were descended from the English Separatists who settled New England in the 1600s.  They were part of a wave of New England farmers who headed west into what was then the wilds of the Northwest Territory during the early 1800s.  Most of them arrived as a result of the completion of the Erie Canal and the end of the Black Hawk War.  They got to what is now Adams County by sailing up the Wisconsin River from the Mississippi River on small barges which they constructed themselves out of materials obtained from the surrounding woodlands.  When they arrived in what is now Adams County there was nothing but dense virgin forest, the "Yankee" New Englanders laid out farms, constructed roads, erected government buildings and established post routes.  They brought with them many of their Yankee New England values, such as a passion for education, establishing many schools as well as staunch support for abolitionism.  They were mostly members of the Congregationalist Church though some were Episcopalian.  Due to the second Great Awakening some of them had converted to Methodism and some became Baptist before moving to what is now Adams County.  Adams County, like much of Wisconsin, would be culturally very continuous with early New England culture for most of its early history.

In the late 1880s, German immigrants began to settle in Adams County, making up less than one out of thirty settlers in the county before this date.  Generally there was little conflict between them and the "Yankee" settlers, however when conflict did arise it focused around the issue of prohibition of alcohol.  On this issue the Yankees were divided and the Germans almost unanimously were opposed to it, tipping the balance in favor of opposition to prohibition.  Later the two communities would be divided on the issue of World War I in which, once again, the Yankee community would be divided and the Germans were unanimously opposed to American entry into the war. The Yankee community was generally pro-British, however many of the Yankees also did not want America to enter the war themselves.  The Germans were sympathetic to Germany and did not want the United States to enter into a war against Germany, but the Germans were not anti-British. Prior to World War I, many German community leaders in Wisconsin spoke openly and enthusiastically about how much better America was than Germany, due primarily (in their eyes) to the presence of English law and the English political culture the Americans had inherited from the colonial era, which they contrasted with the turmoil and oppression in Germany which they had so recently fled.
The area covered by present-day Adams County was historically part of several other counties. In 1840, when Wisconsin was still a territory, Adams County was the southwestern section of Brown County. In 1836, Portage County was created and included most of present-day Columbia County, including the city of Portage, Wisconsin. In 1846, Portage County was renamed Columbia County. The area from the northern boundary of Columbia County to Lake Superior was removed from Brown County and was then called Portage County. In 1848, the southern part of Portage County was renamed Adams County and included all of current-day Adams County and the northern section of Juneau County. Adams County was organized in April 1853. In 1858, The northwestern part of Adams County was joined with the northern part of Sauk County to form present-day Juneau County. At this time, Adams County took its current shape.

Friendship was founded by settlers coming from Friendship, New York. Today, Adams is the largest community in Adams County, but this was not always so. In the 1880s, there were plans for a railroad that connected Chicago and St. Paul to pass through Friendship. Once this was decided, local landowners increased their demands. Instead of paying more for the land in Friendship, the railroad placed the tracks two miles (3 km) south of Friendship. It was recorded that Emma Barnes, wife of "Appletree" Barnes, Friendship postmaster in the 1920s, wrote in 1957, "I believe that the people of Friendship should express their appreciation of two of the early citizens... J. B. Hill and J. W. Purves... for holding the price of their land so high that the great C&NW R.R. Co. would not purchase a right of way... for who would enjoy the smoke and the noise of a train running through this beautiful village?"

To house workers, boxcars were stacked to form housing, and the town of Adams was created. What is now the city of Adams the railroad originally called Friendship, but because there were two rail depot stops named "Friendship" on the rail-line, passengers were often confused and bought the wrong tickets, so it was suggested that the name be changed. The new name was determined by the citizens who chose between Adams, for President John Adams, and Nottingham. This stretch of track became the famous "400" route. Today the population of Adams is about three times that of Friendship, WI.

Geography

Major highways
  Highway 13 (Wisconsin)
  Highway 21 (Wisconsin)
  Highway 23 (Wisconsin)
  Highway 73 (Wisconsin)
  Highway 82 (Wisconsin)

Railroads
Union Pacific

Buses
List of intercity bus stops in Wisconsin

Airport
 63C - Adams County Airport serves the county and surrounding communities.

Adjacent counties
 Wood County – northwest
 Portage County – northeast
 Waushara County – east
 Marquette County – east
 Columbia County – southeast
 Sauk County – southwest
 Juneau County – west

Demographics

2020 census
As of the census of 2020, the population was 20,654. The racial makeup of the county was 90.7% White, 2.9% Black or African American, 1.0% Native American, 0.4% Asian, 1.1% from other races, and 3.9% from two or more races. Ethnically, the population was 3.9% Hispanic or Latino of any race.

2000 census
As of the census of 2000, there were 18,643 people, 7,900 households, and 5,466 families residing in the county.  The population density was 29 people per square mile (11/km2).  There were 14,123 housing units at an average density of 22 per square mile (8/km2).  The racial makeup of the county was 97.63% White, 0.27% Black or African American, 0.59% Native American, 0.33% Asian, 0.02% Pacific Islander, 0.33% from other races, and 0.83% from two or more races.  1.44% of the population were Hispanic or Latino of any race. 39.3% were of German, 14.8% American, 9.2% Polish, 8.3% Norwegian, 8.0% Irish and 6.0% English ancestry. 96.1% spoke English, 1.8% Spanish and 1.1% German as their first language.

There were 7,900 households, out of which 23.60% had children under the age of 18 living with them, 58.50% were married couples living together, 6.70% had a female householder with no husband present, and 30.80% were non-families. 25.50% of all households were made up of individuals, and 11.50% had someone living alone who was 65 years of age or older.  The average household size was 2.33 and the average family size was 2.76.

In the county, the population was spread out, with 20.80% under the age of 18, 5.60% from 18 to 24, 24.30% from 25 to 44, 28.40% from 45 to 64, and 20.90% who were 65 years of age or older.  The median age was 44 years. For every 100 females there were 102.90 males.  For every 100 females age 18 and over, there were 101.30 males.

In 2017, there were 131 births, giving a general fertility rate of 57.1 births per 1000 women aged 15–44, the 17th lowest rate out of all 72 Wisconsin counties. 51 of the births were to unmarried mothers, 80 were to married mothers. In 2017, 12.2% of the babies had a low birthweight, up from 7.8% in 2016 and the highest by percent in the state for 2017. In 71.0% of cases, prenatal care was deemed to be adequate, the 13th lowest in the state. Additionally, there were 10 induced abortions performed on women of Adams County residence in 2017.

Communities

Bracketed number refers to location on map, right

Cities
 Adams (7)
 Wisconsin Dells (also in Columbia County, Juneau County, and Sauk County) (9)

Village
 Friendship (6) (county seat)

Towns

 Adams
 Big Flats
 Colburn
 Dell Prairie
 Easton
 Jackson
 Leola
 Lincoln
 Monroe
 New Chester
 New Haven
 Preston
 Quincy
 Richfield
 Rome
 Springville
 Strongs Prairie

Census-designated places
 Arkdale (4)
 Dellwood (5)
 Grand Marsh (8)
 Lake Arrowhead (1)
 Lake Camelot (3)
 Lake Sherwood (2)

Unincorporated communities

 Big Flats
 Big Spring
 Brookside
 Brooks
 Cottonville
 Davis Corners
 Easton
 Monroe Center
 New Rome
 Plainville
 Rome
 Strongs Prairie
 White Creek

Ghost towns/neighborhoods

 Adams Center
 Dell Prairie
 Fordham
 New Chester
 Pilot Knob
 Quincy
 Roche a Cri
 Springbluff

Politics

See also
 National Register of Historic Places listings in Adams County, Wisconsin
Wisconsin
List of Wisconsin locations by per capita income
List of counties in Wisconsin
Wisconsin statistical areas

References

Further reading
 Goc, Michael J. (ed.) From Past To Present: The History of Adams County. Friendship, Wis.: New Past Press, 1999.
 Memorial and Biographical Record and Illustrated Compendium of Biography ... of Columbia, Sauk and Adams counties, Wisconsin.... Chicago: Geo. A. Ogle, 1901.

External links
 Adams County official website
 Adams County map from the Wisconsin Department of Transportation
 Adams County Chamber of Commerce
 Adams County Historical Society

 
1853 establishments in Wisconsin
Populated places established in 1853